Reckless Youth is a 1922 American silent drama film directed by Ralph Ince and starring Elaine Hammerstein, Niles Welch, and Myrtle Stedman.

Plot
As described in a film magazine, Alice Schuyler (Hammerstein), a selfish flapper expelled from a convent school, goes to live with her crusty old aunt near New York City. Because of the restrictions placed on her, she runs away from home and finds shelter in the nearby home of John Carmen, a wealthy young bachelor. The only way out of the social difficulty that occurs to John is for them to get married. This they do and they live in his town house. Soon they begin to drift apart, she becoming infatuated with Harrison Thomby, a man about town, and a break finally comes when they meet at a cabaret. John goes to his county home and, in a mix up of taxi cabs, takes a chorus girl home with him. Alice arrives on the scene and refuses to listen to his explanations. She accepts an invitation from her friend and, while accompanying him to a dance, their taxi is wrecked and she is badly hurt. While unconscious, she dreams of being trapped on Harrison's yacht, and wakes to find herself in her husband's arms.

Cast
 Elaine Hammerstein as Alice Schuyler 
 Niles Welch as John Carmen 
 Myrtle Stedman as Mrs. Schuyler-Foster 
 Robert Lee Keeling as Mr. Schuyler-Foster 
 Huntley Gordon as Harrison Thomby 
 Louise Prussing as Mrs. Dahlgren 
 Frank Currier as Cumberland Whipple 
 Kate Cherry as Martha Whipple 
 Constance Bennett as Chorus Girl

References

Bibliography
 Munden, Kenneth White. The American Film Institute Catalog of Motion Pictures Produced in the United States, Part 1. University of California Press, 1997.

External links

1922 films
1922 drama films
Films set in New York City
Silent American drama films
Films directed by Ralph Ince
American silent feature films
1920s English-language films
Selznick Pictures films
Flappers
1920s American films